Visa requirements for Zimbabwean citizens are administrative entry restrictions by the authorities of other states placed on citizens of Zimbabwe. , Zimbabwean citizens had visa-free or visa on arrival access to 64 countries and territories, ranking the Zimbabwean passport 80th in terms of travel freedom (tied with passports from Ghana and Philippines) according to the Henley Passport Index.

Where visa-free access is permitted, such access is not necessarily a right, and admission is at the discretion of border enforcement officers. Visitors engaging in activities other than tourism, including unpaid work, may require a visa or work permit.

Visa requirements map

Visa requirements

Dependent, disputed, or restricted territories
Unrecognized or partially recognized countries

Dependent and autonomous territories

Non-visa restrictions

See also

Visa policy of Zimbabwe
List of diplomatic missions in Zimbabwe

References and Notes
References

Notes

Zimbabwe
Foreign relations of Zimbabwe